The Widow from Monte Carlo is a 1935 American comedy film directed by Arthur Greville Collins and starring Warren William, Dolores del Río, Louise Fazenda and Colin Clive.  It was based on the play A Present from Margate by Ian Hay and A.E.W. Mason. It was shot at Warner Brothers's Burbank Studios with sets designed by the art director Hugh Reticker.

Synopsis
Inez, the widowed Duchess of Rye, heads to Monte Carlo to escape her dull restrictive life. While there she meets Major Allan Chepstow, but later becomes engaged to a diplomat who her relatives are keen for her to marry. Impulsively Inez accepts an offer by Chepstow to join him at the seaside resort of Margate. Back in London Rose Torrent, the socially ambitious wife of a wealthy marmalade magnate, discovers about the visit and attempts to blackmail Inez into attending one of her parties. Eventually Chepstow and Inez decide to leave for Canada to start a new life together.

Cast
 Warren William as Major Allan Chepstow
 Dolores del Río as Inez, Duchess of Rye
 Louise Fazenda as Rose Torrent
 Colin Clive as Lord Eric Reynolds
 Herbert Mundin as John Torrent
 Olin Howland as Eaves
 Warren Hymer as Dopey Mullins
 Eily Malyon as Lady Maynard
 E.E. Clive as Lord Holloway 
 Mary Forbes as Lady Holloway 
 Viva Tattersall as Joan, Inez' Secretary 
 Herbert Evans as Evans, Inez' Butler
 May Beatty as Dowager 
 Billy Bevan as Police Officer Watkin
 Charles Coleman as Torrent's Butler
 Gino Corrado as Torrents' Cook
 Olaf Hytten as Englishman at Casino
 Boyd Irwin as Desk Sergeant
 Alphonse Martell as Emil, Hotel Clerk
 Ferdinand Schumann-Heink as Torrents' Chauffeur

References

Bibliography
 Goble, Alan. The Complete Index to Literary Sources in Film. Walter de Gruyter, 1999.

External links

1936 films
1936 comedy films
American comedy films
American films based on plays
Films based on works by Ian Hay
American black-and-white films
Warner Bros. films
Films set in Monaco
Films set in London
Films set in Kent
Films shot in Burbank, California
Films with screenplays by F. Hugh Herbert
Films directed by Arthur Greville Collins
1930s English-language films
1930s American films
Films scored by Heinz Roemheld
Films scored by Bernhard Kaun
Films about widowhood
Films about nobility